Fidel Pintos (August 29, 1905 – May 11, 1974) was an Argentine comedy film actor.

Selected filmography
 The Bohemian Soul (1949)
 The Beautiful Brummel (1951)
 This Is My Life (1952)
 Scandal in the Family (1967)
 La Casa de Madame Lulù (1968)
 Intimacies of a Prostitute (1974)

References

Bibliography
 Gabriele Klein. Tango in Translation. Transcript Verlag, 2009.

External links

1905 births
1974 deaths
Argentine male film actors
20th-century Argentine male actors
People from Buenos Aires